Statistics of the Scottish Football League in season 2002–03.  The season saw two new teams, as Airdrie United and Gretna replaced  Clydebank and Airdrieonians.

Scottish First Division

Scottish Second Division

Scottish Third Division

References

See also
2002–03 in Scottish football

 
Scottish Football League seasons